New Theatres is an Indian film studio. It was formed in Calcutta by producer B. N. Sircar (Birendranath Sircar, the recipient of Dadasaheb Phalke Award of 1970). It was formed on 10 February 1931. Motto of this company was– Jivatang Jyotiretu Chhayam (Light infusing shadows with life). Sircar preferred to function

roughly analogous to what in USA was known as an executive producer. He built a processing laboratory... and got around him a devoted band of people.... Having decided on or approved a story or a subject for a film and the team to make it [Sircar] ensured that adequate funds were provided... but refrained from interfering with its execution. He made New Theatres a symbol of Bengali cinema's artistic good taste and technical excellence.

Dena Paona, a Bengali talkie, was produced by New Theatres and released in 1931. It was directed by Premankur Atarthi, with music composed by Raichand Boral.

According to Kironmoy Raha, "New Theatres made its reputation secure with Chandidas directed by Debaki Bose in 1932," after the studio had produced five talkies.

In 1935, P.C. Barua directed and acted in Devdas, based on Saratchandra Chatterjee's novel Devdas, and this film became phenomenally successful in the industry.

In 1935, playback singing was first used in India in the Bengali film Bhagya Chakra by Nitin Bose. The singers were K C Dey, Parul Ghosh and Suprabha Sarkar. Dhoop Chhaon, Hindi remake of this film, was the first Hindi film to use playback singing.

Kanan Devi was the first popular star actress, who appeared in many films produced by New Theatres. Also there was a group of talented actors with New Theatres like K.L. Saigal, K. C. Dey, Prithviraj Kapoor, Chhabi Biswas, Bikash Roy, Pahari Sanyal, Basanta Choudhury.

Directors like Premankur Atarthi, P.C. Barua, Debaki Bose, Phani Majumdar and Nitin Bose worked in New Theatres films. Musicians who worked there included R. C. Boral, Pankaj Mullick, Timir Baran and Mani Bardhan.

Filmography
New Theatres produced films in its own studios at Tollygunge in Kolkata, founded on 10 February 1931. From 1931 to 1955, 150 films were shot in these studios. New Theatres made comeback with the 2011 film Aadur Prem. New Theatres films include:<ref
    name=bfdlist></ref>
 Dena Paona (Released 30 December 1931) - Directed by Premankur Atarthi
 Natir Puja (Released 22 March 1932)
 Punarjanma (Released 2 April 1932) - Directed by Premankur Atarthi
 Chirakumar Sabha (Released 28 May 1932) - Directed by Premankur Atarthi
 Pallisamaj (Released 1 July 1932) - Directed by Sisir Bhaduri
 Chandidas (Released 24 September 1932) - Directed by Debaki Bose
 Mohabbat Ke Ansu (Released 1932) - Directed by Premankur Atorthy
 Zinda Lash (Released 1932) - Directed by Premankur Atorthy
 Subah Ka Sitara (Released 1932) - Directed by Premankur Atorthy
 Kapalkundala (Released 20 May 1933) - Directed by Premankur Atarthi
 Mastuto Bhai (short) (Released 20 May 1933) - Directed by Dhirendranath Gangopadhyay
 Dulari Bibi (short comedy) (Released 1933) - Directed by Debaki Bose
 Puran Bhagat (Released 1933) - Directed by Debaki Bose
 Sita (Released 26 October 1933) - Directed by Sisir Bhaduri
 Rajrani Meera (Released 1933) - Directed by Debaki Bose
 Mirabai (Released 11 November 1933) - Directed by Debaki Bose
 Daku Mansoor (Released 1934) -Directed by Nitin Bose
 Excuse Me Sir (short) (Released 30 March 1934) - Directed by Dhirendranath Gangopadhyay
 Ruplekha (Released 14 April 1934) - Directed by P.C. Barua
 P.Brothers (Cartoon) (Released 23 June 1934) - Directed by Raichand Boral
 Mahua (Released 31 August 1934) - Directed by Hiren Bose
 Chandidas (Released 1934) - Directed by Nitin Bose
 Devdas (Released 30 March 1935) - Directed by P.C. Barua
 Abaseshe (short) (Released 24 August 1935) - Directed by Dineshranjan Das
 Bhagyachakra (Released 3 October 1935) - Directed by Nitin Bose
 Manzil (1936) - Directed by P.C. Barua
 Grihadaha (Released 10 October 1936) - Directed by P.C. Barua
 Karodpati a.k.a. Millionaire (Released 1936) - Directed by Hemchander Chunder
 Mando Ki (short) (Released 21 October 1936) - Directed by Tulsi Lahiri
 Maya (Released 23 December 1936) - Directed by P.C. Barua
 President (Released 1 Jan 1937) - Directed by Nitin Bose
 Didi (Released 3 April 1937) - Directed by Nitin Bose
 Mukti (Released 18 September 1937) - Directed by P.C. Barua
 Arghya (short) (Released 25 September 1937)
 Vidyapati (Hindi) (Released 1937) - Directed by Debaki Bose
 Abhagin (Released 11 June 1938) - Directed by Praflla Roy
 Bidyapati (Released 2 April 1938) - Directed by Debaki Bose
 Abhignan (Released 11 June 1938) - Directed by Prafulla Ray
 Desher mati (Released 17 August 1938) - Directed by Nitin Bose
 Achinpriya (Released 29 October 1938) - Directed by Dhirendranath Gangopadhyay
 Sathi (Released 3 December 1938) - Directed by Phani Majumdar
 Street Singer (Released 1938) -Directed by Phani Majumdar
 Adhikar (Released 12 January 1939) - Directed by P.C. Barua
 Dushman (Released 1 Jan 1939) - Directed by Nitin Bose
 Baradidi (Released 7 April 1939) - Directed by Amar Mullik
 Sapure (Released 27 May 1939) - Directed by Debaki Bose
 Rajat Jayanti (Released 12 August 1939) - Directed by P.C. Barua
 Jiban Maran (Released 14 October 1939) - Directed by Nitin Bose
 Parajoy (Released 22 March 1940) - Directed by Hemchandra Chandra
 Daktar (Released 31 August 1940) - Directed by Phani Majumdar
 Abhinetri (Released 30 November 1940) - Directed by Amar Mullik
 Nartaki (Hindi) (Released 24 December 1940) - Directed by Debaki Bose
 Nartaki (Bengali) (Released 18 January 1941) - Directed by Debaki Bose
 Parichoy (Released 25 April 1941) - Directed by Nitin Bose
 Pratishruti (Released 14 August 1941) - Directed by Hemchandra Chandra
 Shodhbodh (Released 28 March 1942) - Directed by Soumen Mukhopadhyay
 Minakshi (Released 12 June 1942) - Directed by Madhu Bose
 Priyo Bandhabi (Released 23 January 1943) - Directed by Soumen Mukhopadhyay
 Kashinath (Released 2 April 1943) - Directed by Nitin Bose
 Dikshul (Released 12 June 1943) - Directed by Premankur Atarthi
 Udayer Pathey (Released 1 September 1944) - Directed by Bimal Roy
 Hamrahi (1945) - Directed by Bimal Roy
 Dui Purush (Released 30 August 1945) - Directed by Subodh Mitra
 Biraj Bou (Released 5 July 1946) - Directed by Amar Mullik
 Nurse Sisi (Released 27 April 1947) - Directed by Subodh Mitra
 Ramer Sumati (Released 24 December 1947) - Directed by Kartik Chattopadhyay
 Pratibad (Released 19 June 1948) - Directed by Hemchandra Chandra
 Anjangarh (Released 24 September 1948) - Directed by Bimal Roy
 Mantramugdha (Released 14 January 1949) - Directed by Bimal Roy
 Bishnupriya (Released 7 October 1949) - Directed by Hemchandra Chandra
 Rupkatha (Released 13 October 1950) - Directed by Soren Sen
 Yatrik (Released 1952) - Directed by Kartick Chatterjee
 Bhagaban Shree Shree Ramkrishna (1955) - Directed by Prafulla Chakravarty<ref
    name=rk1955youtube>"The film - Bhagavan Sri Ramakrishna - revised file" (on YouTube); English subtitles give credits for Kanu Banerji (Sri Ramakrishna, 0:08), Bibhuti Chakravarty (photography, 0:11), Baidyanath Chaterji (producer, 0:30), Pulin Ghosh (stage setting, 0:44), New Theatre Studio (production location, 0:53), Officials of Dakshineshwar Kali Temple (thanks, 1:05), Chabi Bishwas (Mathur, 1:23), Shobha Sen (Sri Ma Saradadevi, 1:23), Kalyani Films (production, 1:38), Prafulla Chakravarty (script writer and director, 1:43) (accessed 14 January 2013)</ref>
 Aadur Prem, 2011<ref
    name=newback>New Theatres Is Back</ref>  - Directed by Somnath Gupta

References

External links
www.kundanlalsaigal.org - Comprehensive Resource Website, offering preview of all his songs.
www.pankajmullick.com - Comprehensive Resource Website, offering preview of his songs.
www.krishnachandradey.com - Comprehensive Resource Website, offering preview of his songs.
www.kanandevi.com
 
 Musicians
 A short history of Bengali cinema
 A Biography of B N Sircar
 An article on New Theatres by Sharmistha Gooptu

Indian film studios
Cinema of Bengal
Film production companies based in Kolkata
1931 establishments in India